Miguel Gómez may refer to:

 Miguel Gómez (photographer) (born 1974), Colombian-American photographer
 Miguel Gómez Damas (1785–1849), Spanish Carlist general
 Miguel Ángel Gómez Martínez (born 1949), Spanish conductor
 Miguel Gómez Bao (1894–1961), Spanish-born Argentine actor
 Miguel Gómez (pitcher) (born 1974), Panamanian baseball pitcher
 Miguel Gómez (infielder) (born 1992), Dominican baseball infielder
 Miguel Gomez (actor) (born 1985), Colombian-American actor and rapper
 Miguel Gómez Palapa, Mexican football midfielder
 José Miguel Gómez (1858–1921), Cuban politician, president of Cuba
 Miguel Mariano Gómez (1890–1950), Cuban politician, president of Cuba, and son of José Miguel Gómez

See also
 Miguel Gomes (disambiguation)